Zena McNally (born 8 March 1986) is an English radio presenter and one of the original members of girl-group Mis-Teeq. She left in early 2001, just before the group had real chart success. She featured on their first single.

McNally married footballer Cory Gibbs in July 2008.

Discography

Singles

References 

1979 births
Living people
Mis-Teeq members
People from Birmingham, West Midlands
British radio DJs
British contemporary R&B singers
UK garage singers
British people of Maltese descent
BBC Radio 1Xtra presenters
21st-century English women singers
21st-century English singers
British radio presenters
British women radio presenters